Kurdeh (also Romanized as Kūrdeh) is a village in Baghan Rural District, Mahmeleh District, Khonj County, Fars Province, Iran. At the 2006 census, its population was 1,736, in 357 families.

References 

Populated places in Khonj County